Acacia nesophila is a species of wattle native to north Queensland.

References

nesophila
Flora of Queensland